Scoparia berytella is a species of moth in the family Crambidae. It is found on Cyprus, as well as in Syria and Lebanon.

The wingspan is about 19 mm.

References

Moths described in 1911
Scorparia